The American Legion Hall near Eads, Colorado was built during 1937-38 under the Works Progress Administration.  It is a one-story  building that was listed on the National Register of Historic Places in 2007.  Also known as Kiowa County Fairgrounds Community Building, it served as a meeting hall and was NRHP-listed for its architecture.  According to its NRHP nomination, it is a "rare surviving example of a simple, vernacular building constructed by the WPA".

References

American Legion buildings
Buildings and structures completed in 1938
Buildings and structures in Kiowa County, Colorado
Clubhouses on the National Register of Historic Places in Colorado
National Register of Historic Places in Kiowa County, Colorado